Juan Antonio Delgado Baeza (born 5 March 1993) is a Chilean professional footballer who plays as a winger or right-back for Primeira Liga side Paços Ferreira and the Chile national team.

Club career

Colo-Colo
Born in Chillán, Delgado made his first team debut for Colo-Colo at the age of 17 during the 2011 Torneo Apertura. After nearly 2 years playing mostly in the B-team, Delgado became a regular under Héctor Tapia's management, with the first main achievement of his being a goal in a 3–2 victory against the club's main rivals Universidad de Chile. Delgado retained protagonism during the 2014 Torneo Clausura where he played 14 games and scored two goals as Colo-Colo won the title.

Gimnàstic
On 5 August 2016, Delgado signed a four-year contract with Spanish Segunda División side Gimnàstic de Tarragona.

International career
After playing the 2014 Toulon Tournament with the U-20 squad and showing good form in Colo-Colo, Delgado received his first call-up to the national squad for the friendlies against Mexico and Haiti. He made his debut against Mexico, playing a little over five minutes as a late substitute. Days later, he was a starter against Haiti, where he scored his first international goal in the 21st minute.

Career statistics

Club statistics

National team

International goals
Score and Result lists Chile's goals first

Honours
Colo-Colo
Primera División de Chile: 2014 Clausura, 2015 Apertura

References

External links

1993 births
Living people
People from Chillán
Chilean footballers
Association football fullbacks
Association football wingers
Segunda División Profesional de Chile players
Chilean Primera División players
Segunda División players
Primeira Liga players
Liga MX players
Colo-Colo footballers
Colo-Colo B footballers
Gimnàstic de Tarragona footballers
C.D. Tondela players
Club Necaxa footballers
F.C. Paços de Ferreira players
Chile youth international footballers
Chile under-20 international footballers
Chile international footballers
Chilean expatriate footballers
Chilean expatriate sportspeople in Spain
Chilean expatriate sportspeople in Portugal
Chilean expatriate sportspeople in Mexico
Expatriate footballers in Spain
Expatriate footballers in Portugal
Expatriate footballers in Mexico
Chilean expatriates in Portugal
Chilean expatriates in Mexico